Will Jubb (born 17 September 1996) is an English professional rugby league footballer who plays as a hooker for the York Knights in the Betfred Championship.

He previously played for Hull Kingston Rovers in the Super League.

Jubb made his début for the Robins in their middle eights round 4 victory over the London Broncos, managing to score a try in the 58-18 win. He then played a further 3 games from the interchange bench against Leigh, Huddersfield and against Salford in the Million Pound Game which Rovers lost and which sealed their relegation to the second tier
In December 2017 he signed a one-year deal with York, having played for them on dual-registration during the 2017 season.

Ambassador for Club Wilber - York Based Children's club for children with sight problems. Part of the Wilberforce Trust

References

External links
York City Knights profile
Hull Wyke profile

1996 births
Living people
English rugby league players
Rugby league hookers
Hull Kingston Rovers players
York City Knights players